Perry is a city in Dallas County, Iowa, United States, along the North Raccoon River. The population was 7,836 at the time of the 2020 Census. It is part of the Des Moines–West Des Moines Metropolitan Statistical Area.

Formerly a major railroad junction, Perry is home to the Historic Hotel Pattee, with themed rooms including many related to the railroad.

History
Perry was laid out as a town in 1869.  The original townsite was bounded by Estella Street on the south, 8th Street on the east, 3rd Street on the west, & Dewey Avenue on the north.

Geography
Perry is located at  (41.840107, -94.099978).

Climate

According to the Köppen Climate Classification system, Perry has a hot-summer humid continental climate, abbreviated "Dfa" on climate maps.

Demographics

2010 census
At the 2010 census there were 7,702 people, 2,792 households, and 1,920 families living in the city. The racial makup of the city was 79.1% White, 1.8% African American, 0.5% Native American, 0.8% Asian, 0.1% Pacific Islander, 14.1% from other races, and 3.5% from two or more races. Hispanic or Latino of any race were 40.0%.

Of the 2,792 households 37.8% had children under the age of 18 living with them, 47.0% were married couples living together, 12.7% had a female householder with no husband present, 7.3% had a male householder with no wife present, and 33.0% were non-families. 28.2% of households were one person and 13.9% were one person aged 65 or older. The average household size was 2.71 and the average family size was 3.29.

The median age was 33.3 years. 29.8% of residents were under the age of 18; 8.9% were between the ages of 18 and 24; 25.3% were from 25 to 44; 22.3% were from 45 to 64; and 13.8% were 65 or older. The gender makeup of the city was 50.0% male and 50.0% female.

2000 census
At the 2000 census there were 7,633 people, 2,831 households, and 1,942 families living in the city. The racial makup of the city was 82.84% White, 1.06% African American, 0.33% Native American, 0.75% Asian, 0.18% Pacific Islander, 13.19% from other races, and 1.65% from two or more races. Hispanic or Latino of any race were 24.54%.

Of the 2,831 households 34.5% had children under the age of 18 living with them, 52.1% were married couples living together, 10.9% had a female householder with no husband present, and 31.4% were non-families. 26.3% of households were one person and 14.0% were one person aged 65 or older. The average household size was 2.64 and the average family size was 3.13.

The age distribution was 27.3% under the age of 18, 8.9% from 18 to 24, 29.5% from 25 to 44, 18.2% from 45 to 64, and 16.0% 65 or older. The median age was 35 years. For every 100 females, there were 98.0 males. For every 100 females age 18 and over, there were 95.0 males.

The median household income was $35,429 and the median family income  was $41,771. Males had a median income of $27,610 versus $21,839 for females. The per capita income for the city was $15,935. About 8.9% of families and 12.2% of the population were below the poverty line, including 15.6% of those under age 18 and 9.4% of those age 65 or over.

Economy
In April 2018, a video showcasing Perry's economy in 1979 and 1980 was released by Iowa State University.

A major employer in Perry is the Tyson Foods pork plant.

Education
The Perry Community School District operates local area public schools.

The Roman Catholic Diocese of Des Moines operates St. Patrick School in Perry. The school was dedicated on February 21, 1921. The local Catholic high school is Dowling Catholic High School in West Des Moines.

Media
 KDLS-FM
 KDLS (AM)
 KICG

Notable people  

 William Bell (1902–1971), premier American tuba player and teacher
 Sam Brinton (born  1988), nuclear engineer and LGBTQ activist
 George W. Clarke (1906–2006), Washington State Legislator
 Gertrude Mary Cox (1900–1978), influential American statistician
 Dan Grimm (1941–2018), American football offensive lineman in the NFL for the Green Bay Packers, Atlanta Falcons, Baltimore Colts, and Washington Redskins
 V. T. Hamlin (1900–1993), cartoonist and creator of Alley Oop
 Dwight D. Opperman (1923–2013), CEO of West Publishing, later known as Thomson Reuters
 Jessica Reznicek (born 1981), Catholic Worker Movement and environmental activist

See also

 Raccoon River Valley Trail
 BRR - Bicycle Ride to Rippey
 Sports Illustrated 40th Anniversary Swimsuit Special: American Beauty (2004)
 Impact of the COVID-19 pandemic on the meat industry in the United States

References

External links

 
 Perry Online
 The Perry News
 City Data Comprehensive Statistical Data and more about Perry
 Raccoon Valley Radio

 
Cities in Dallas County, Iowa
Cities in Iowa
Des Moines metropolitan area
1869 establishments in Iowa
Populated places established in 1869